Stašaičiai (formerly) is a village in Kėdainiai district municipality, in Kaunas County, in central Lithuania. According to the 2011 census, the village had a population of 11 people. The Stašaičiai hillfort is located in the village.

Demography

References

Villages in Kaunas County
Kėdainiai District Municipality